There are several movements called Front de la Jeunesse:
 Front de la Jeunesse, a disbanded militant movement in Belgium.
 Front de la Jeunesse, the youth organization of the French Front National.

See also
 Lajeunesse (disambiguation)